This is the Finnish men's 100 metres all-time list.

Top 16

References
 Tilastopaja Oy
 Finnish Athletics (Suomen Urheiluliitto)

100 m